Sibutu, officially the Municipality of Sibutu,  is a  municipality in the province of Tawi-Tawi, Philippines. According to the 2020 census, it has a population of 34,243 people.

History 
Due to an administrative error in the Treaty of Paris, while the remainder of the Philippines was ceded to the United States, Sibutu and Cagayán de Sulu were retained under Spanish Sovereignty until they were formally ceded to the United States upon the ratification of the Treaty of Washington on March 23, 1901.

The municipality was created out of Sitangkai, Tawi-Tawi, by virtue of Muslim Mindanao Autonomy Act No. 197, which was subsequently ratified in a plebiscite held on October 21, 2006.

Geography
Sibutu Island is 50 km.or 31 miles away from Sabah state. People living in Sibutu Island are mostly boat builders. The people also sell seaweeds, firewood and stones.

It is an important site for nature conservation.

Barangays
Sibutu is politically subdivided into 16 barangays.

 Ambutong Sapal
 Datu Amilhamja Jaafar
 Hadji Imam Bidin
 Hadji Mohtar Sulayman
 Hadji Taha
 Imam Hadji Mohammad
 Nunukan
 Sheik Makdum
 Sibutu (Poblacion)
 Talisay
 Tandu Banak
 Tandu Owak
 Taungoh
 Tongehat
 Tongsibalo
 Ungus-ungus

Climate

Demographics

Economy

References

External links 
Sibutu Profile at PhilAtlas.com
[ Philippine Standard Geographic Code]
Sibutu Profile at the DTI Cities and Municipalities Competitive Index
NSCB: newly created provinces, municipalities, barangays, converted city Accessed on March 9, 2006.

Municipalities of Tawi-Tawi
Islands of Tawi-Tawi
Island municipalities in the Philippines